Girolamo Lamanna (1580–1640) was an Italian painter. Born in Catania, Sicily, he was active as a painter of histories as well as a poet. He published some of his poetry with a Roman literary academy of I fantasticci

References

16th-century Italian painters
Italian male painters
17th-century Italian painters
Artists from Catania
Painters from Sicily
1580 births
1640 deaths